Douglas Assis de Oliveira, commonly known as Douglas Assis, is a Brazilian footballer who plays as a centre-back for Sampaio Corrêa in 2019 Campeonato Brasileiro Série C, on loan from Brasil de Pelotas.

Career
Douglas Assis started his career with Cabofriense in the junior ranks, moving up to the senior squad in 2005, and reaching the semi-final of the Taça Guanabara. Two years later he was part of the squad which reached the final of 2007 Campeonato Carioca#Taça Rio. He left in 2010 to become a member of the Madureira team that played in national league competition for the first time, in 2010 Campeonato Brasileiro Série D, winning promotion at the first attempt. He also represented Macaé for four seasons in the national league, in Campeonato Brasileiro Série C in 2011, 2012 and 2014 and in 2015 Campeonato Brasileiro Série B, punctuated by a spell with Vila Nova in 2013 Campeonato Brasileiro Série C. He returned to Vila Nova for the 2016 season, but lost his place in the 2016 Campeonato Brasileiro Série B team when a new coach arrived and terminated his contract in September, allowing him to rejoin his first club Cabofriense for the 2017 season.

Douglas Assis joined Boa Esporte in February 2017, and in one of his first 2017 Campeonato Brasileiro Série B games, scored a direct free-kick from the half-way line against Figueirense which resulted in the debut, and Figueirense career, of goalkeeper Fábio ending at half-time. At the end of the season he signed with São Bento for 2018. His 2018 Campeonato Brasileiro Série B season was cut short with a cruciate ligament injury in July.

In December 2018 Douglas Assis was announced as one of the new signings of the Brasil de Pelotas squad to play in the 2019 Campeonato Gaúcho, and after the end of the competition was loaned to Sampaio Corrêa for the 2019 Campeonato Brasileiro Série C season.

References

External links
 

Living people
1985 births
Association football defenders
Associação Desportiva Cabofriense players
Bangu Atlético Clube players
Fluminense FC players
Audax Rio de Janeiro Esporte Clube players
Madureira Esporte Clube players
Macaé Esporte Futebol Clube players
Vila Nova Futebol Clube players
Boa Esporte Clube players
Esporte Clube São Bento players
Grêmio Esportivo Brasil players
Sampaio Corrêa Futebol Clube players
Campeonato Brasileiro Série B players
Campeonato Brasileiro Série C players
Campeonato Brasileiro Série D players
Footballers from Rio de Janeiro (city)
Brazilian footballers